Cementerio Club is a Peruvian alternative rock band formed in 1996. In 1999 MTV began to play their videoclip of the song "Barco Viejo" and in 2001 MTV played another video of them called "Sometimes Bonita". In 2004, Cementerio Club was nominated to "Best New Central Artist" category at the MTV Video Music Awards Latin America  for their video "Inmortales", and won it. That same year, their album "Cementerio Aclubstico ¿Aún Crees En La Magia?" won "Album Of The Year" in MTV.
Their bassist/guitar and leader José Arbulú has also released his debut album as a solo career called "Libres", the lead guitar Pedro Solano also has releases his debut album as a solo career called "+ Amor.

Members
José Arbulú (vocals,  (Bass, Guitar)
Pedro Solano (vocals,  Lead Guitar)
Ricardo Solís (Guitar)
Luis Callirgos (drums)

Discography
Cementerio Club (1997)
Cerca (2000)
Canciones Desnudas Para Iluminar Los Cuerpos (2001)
Vacaciones En Mediocielo (2003)
Cementerio Aclubstico ¿Aun Crees En La Magia? (2004)
Bailando En El Muladar (2007)
Tiempo (2015)

Singles
Underground
Barco viejo
Tal vez mañana
Ella va
Sometimes bonita
El mago
Jade
Inmortales
Esfera de cristal
Crepúsculo
Hotel Apocalipsis
No puedo esperar
Ya no me pones

References 

Peruvian musical groups